Cyclophragma centralistrigata is a moth of the family Lasiocampidae. It is found in Australia.

References

Moths described in 1904
Lasiocampidae